Goscombe may refer to:

John Goscombe
Goscombe John